North Bannister is a small town located in the Wheatbelt region of Western Australia,  south-southeast of the state capital, Perth along Albany Highway between Armadale and Williams.

The town's name honours Thomas Bannister who discovered the nearby Bannister River, a tributary of the Hotham River, in 1830 while leading the first overland expedition from Perth to King George Sound (now Albany). The name was applied to the river in 1832 by surveyor-general John Septimus Roe.

The site of the original police station house and coach house on Albany Highway is now occupied by the Riverside Roadhouse, which is a stop on the Transwa bus services to Albany and Esperance.

References

Towns in Western Australia
Wheatbelt (Western Australia)